Calvary Episcopal Church is a parish of the Episcopal Diocese of Pittsburgh, Pennsylvania. The parish was founded in 1855.

History
In 1854, Mrs. Mathilda Dallas Wilkins, a prominent East Liberty resident and the wife of Judge William Wilkins, requested unsuccessfully of Bishop Alonzo Potter, the third bishop of the Diocese of Pennsylvania, that an Episcopal parish be founded in East Liberty. Not to be deterred, Mrs. Wilkins spearheaded an organizational meeting for a new parish. The Rev. William Paddock agreed to lead regular services for a new congregation on the condition that an appropriate worship site was found. Rev. Paddock, along with thirteen others, then incorporated Calvary Episcopal Church, subsequently adopting a charter and by-laws. The first services of the new Calvary congregation were held in January 1855 in space rented from a German Lutheran Church. The building was located in an alley between Collins and Sheridan avenues in the Village of East Liberty. Within a year, Calvary bought this first building.

The Calvary congregation grew and, in 1861, decided to purchase a lot a few blocks east of its first site at the corner of Penn Avenue and Station Street. On this property Calvary built a Gothic revival church that featured a ribbed-vaulted ceiling and steeply pitched Victorian roof. The architect was Richard Upjohn; construction cost was $9,000, of which $4,000 was mortgaged. As the parish continued to grow, major additions were erected between 1870 and 1895. Calvary called its fourth rector, Boyd Vincent, in 1874 and the parish grew rapidly under his leadership. During this time, the church began new missions that continued long after his rectorship. By 1900, Calvary Episcopal Church was the largest and most influential parish in the Diocese of Pittsburgh. Calvary can be credited with the creation of several missions in the Pittsburgh region, sparked largely by Boyd Vincent, that eventually became established Episcopal parishes in Wilkinsburg (St. Stephen's), Oakland (Ascension), Mt. Lebanon (St. Paul's), and Fox Chapel (Fox Chapel Episcopal Church).

At the turn of the twentieth century, East Liberty's demographics began to change and the challenges of neighborhood decline caused Calvary congregation to consider relocation. In December 1904, the Calvary Vestry met to consider the sale of the Penn Avenue church and the construction of a new, larger structure. The decision to move was not an easy one. Although traffic noise from Penn Avenue and the Pennsylvania Railroad made the second location less desirable, church members felt great affection for their second church building. In early 1905, parishioners agreed to sell the second church property and authorize the purchase of a property on the northeast corner of Shady Avenue and Walnut Street for the new church.

For its new building on Shady Avenue, Calvary selected Ralph Adams Cram as architect. The choice was perhaps a surprising one given Cram's championing of Gothic architecture, which favored "high church" tendencies, and Calvary congregation's preference of "low church" practices. In example, the "low church" characteristic is evidenced in that Morning Prayer was the most common form of Sunday worship, while the Eucharist was only celebrated once a month. Reconciling this difference, Cram promised his design would be "strong, chaste, and uplifting." He drew inspiration of Calvary Church from Netley and Tintern abbeys in England. His vision included elements of Arthurian mysticism as well as Anglo-Catholicism. The spire and arches, according to Cram, "point us upward," the cross "everywhere crowns the whole," and "the ornament everywhere visible on buttress and balustrade, on door and windows and wall, is the shield as a symbol of the power of faith."

On December 19, 1907, Calvary held its first service in the imposing Gothic structure on Shady Avenue, which, at that time, consisted only of the church connected to a three-story parish house. The total cost was $400,000, but within seven years Calvary was free of debt, due in part to the generous assistance of industrialist, Henry Clay Frick. Frick's daughter, Helen Clay Frick, donated 11 bells from the Meneely Bell Foundry in Troy, NY, which can still be heard ringing from Calvary's landmark tower. Despite Cram's grand Gothic architecture, Calvary parish continued worship for many years in a "low church" fashion. Eventually, however, the grandeur and size of the new building led to a greater use of pageantry, more formal vestments, and full processions with choir, clergy, and acolytes. These being attributes of "high church" ritual, the influence of Cram's architecture had effect on the congregation.

From the congregation's beginning in 1855, Calvary relied on pew rentals to raise money for expenses. Under Calvary's by-laws, only members who rented pews were permitted to vote in annual parish meetings. By the 1940s, there was no longer availability of pews to rent, resulting in the disenfranchisement of some members. At its 1950 annual meeting, the vestry passed a resolution ending pew rentals. There is some documentation, though, that pledging and pew rentals occurred simultaneously during a period of transition.

Through the 1970s, Calvary followed a socially liberal course, while the Episcopal Diocese of Pittsburgh shifted toward conservatism. This greatly impacted Calvary's influence within the Pittsburgh Diocese and upon its ability to advocate in the national Episcopal Church. Calvary was at the forefront of the ordination of women in the Episcopal Church. In 1974, the Rev. Beryl Choi, one of the first ordained women in the Church's history, became the first woman to hold a continuing parish appointment as a priest in the Diocese of Pittsburgh. Since then, women have always been represented among the clergy at Calvary.

Building dimensions and seating capacity
 Extreme Length = 208 feet
 Extreme Width of Transepts = 108 feet
 Height of Nave = 55 feet
 Height of Lantern Tower = 75 feet
 Height of Tower = 119 feet
 Height of Spire = 101 feet
 Grade line to tip of Spire Cross = 220 feet
 Current Seating Capacity = 1,000 persons

Cram on Calvary

Cram believed that "the foundation of good architecture and structural integrity" was made visible in his work at Calvary Church. When viewing the church's exterior, the concept of an organic whole is observed by a clear and layered geometry. Each part - the tower, transepts, lancets, buttress, and west facade - form a cohesive whole. The Indiana limestone exterior presents a refined austerity, assisting in the way the building's form points toward the heavens at ever-higher levels. The viewer's eye is eased upward by the repeating, slender, and triple lancets as well as the play of light and shadow across the church's surface. Cram justifiably took great pride in the tower and remarked on it in his memoirs: "The central tower I look upon with a certain satisfaction, since there appears a new solution of the old problem of the transition from the square of the basic tower to the polygon of the spire. The building's exterior forms give promise of what lies inside this great sacred vessel." In a 1907 letter he described it as, "The best thing we ever did or shall do."

Stained glass in Calvary Church
Cram greatly disliked the stained glass of his contemporaries, John LaFarge and Louis Comfort Tiffany, and wanted his churches to reflect earlier medieval aesthetics. Having difficulty finding craftsmen to recreate such techniques in the United States, Cram often turned to English artisans for stained glass. Heaton, Butler, and Bayne of London designed twenty-three windows in Calvary Church, including the large transept window of early English saints, martyrs, and missionaries. Cram eventually discovered two important American stained glass artists in Pittsburgh with whom he could work.

Pittsburgh's great innovator in stained glass was William Willet (1869-1921), the art director of Pittsburgh Stained Glass Company. Willet's first window was installed during 1903 in First Presbyterian Church downtown, two years before construction began at Calvary Church. This window was celebrated as the first antique medallion window produced in the country to emulate medieval standards. Cram saw the window, was impressed by it, and hired Willet to work in Calvary Church. Willet designed the East (Passion) Window above Calvary's high altar, the Annunciation window in the Lady Chapel, and the third window in the nave's north aisle depicting The Greatest in the Kingdom.

The second artisan in Pittsburgh significant to Calvary's stained glass was Charles J. Connick (1875-1945). Connick originally worked under Willet at the Pittsburgh Stained Glass Company. He, having studied with Willet, was also a leader in the recreation of medieval stained glass techniques. Some of his best work is located in Pittsburgh, including Calvary Episcopal Church, where there are fourteen major windows plus sixteen lantern tower and twelve chancel clerestory windows by him in the church. Connick also designed several other windows located throughout the building.

Other stained glass windows in Calvary Episcopal Church include works by Cox & Sons of London, England; Harry E. Goodhue Company of Cambridge, Massachusetts; Gorham Company of New York, New York; and Reynolds, Francis & Rohnstock of Boston, Massachusetts.

Stained glass windows, subjects, memorials, and donors by firm with location and date 
C.J. Connick, Boston, Mass
St. Jude (South Nave Clerestory, in memory of Jeannie Lowrie Childs Wurtz by Mr. A.J. Wurtz, 1925)
St. Philip (South Nave Clerestory, in memory of Sarah Stewart Griffin by Hermon Griffin & Mrs. W.H. Nimick, Jr., 1923)
St. Matthias (North Nave Clerestory, in memory of John M., Mary M., John A., and Hester J. Murtland by John Woodwell, 1925)
St. Simon (North Nave, in memory of Jennie Nimick Stewart by Mr. Glenn Stewart, 1924)
St. Thomas (North Nave, in memory of David Glenn Stewart by Mr. Glenn Stewart, 1924)
St. John the Evangelist (North Nave Clerestory, in memory Caroline Austin Hogg by Elizabeth E Hogg, 1923)
St. Cornelius (North Transept Clerestory West, in memory of Catherine A. Holmes by Mr. A.V. Holmes, 1925)
St. Silas (North Transept Clerestory West, in memory of Dr. A.J. Davis, early friend and founder, by Mrs. W.K.T. Sahm, 1925)
St. Timothy (South Transept Clerestory West, in memory of Cortlandt Whitehead, Bishop II Pittsburgh, by Calvary Parishioners, 1923)
St. Titus (South Transept Clerestory West, in memory of John Barrett Kerfoot, Bishop I Pittsburgh, by Calvary Parishioners, 1923)
St. Barnabas (South Transept Clerestory West, in memory of Boyd Vincent, Rector IV, by Calvary Parishioners, 1923)
St. John Mark (South Transept Clerestory, in memory of George Hodges, Rector V, by Calvary Parishioners, 1923)
Christian Virtues (12) (Chancel Clerestory, in memory of John Woodwell by Mrs. John Woodwell, 1934)
Mary and Martha (Lady Chapel Gallery, in memory of Elizabeth Kaye Sahm by Mrs. A Connolly, Mrs. L. McIntyre, Mrs. J. Gish, 1939)
Supper at Emmaus (Choir Ambulatory, in memory of Charles Adam and Caroline Childs Wolfe by Wolfe Family, 1936)
St. Francis (Lantern Tower South, "Friendly", in memory of The Hon. and Mrs. John H. Bailey, by Mr. Reade W. Bailey, 1922)
St. Elizabeth (Lantern Tower South, "Friendly", in memory of The Hon. and Mrs. John H. Bailey, by Mr. Reade W. Bailey, 1922)
St. Agnes (Lantern Tower South, "Friendly", in memory of The Hon. and Mrs. John H. Bailey, by Mr. Reade W. Bailey, 1922)
St. Vincent de Paul (Lantern Tower South, "Friendly", in memory of The Hon. and Mrs. John H. Bailey, by Mr. Reade W. Bailey, 1922)
St. Jerome (Lantern Tower West, "Wise", by Calvary Parishioners, 1922)
St. Ambrose (Lantern Tower West, "Wise", by Calvary Parishioners, 1922
St. Augustine (Lantern Tower West, "Wise", in memory of James & Jane H.M. Bryar by Miss Henrietta Bryar, 1922)
St. Gregory (Lantern Tower West, "Wise", in memory of Harvey B. Gaul, organist/choirmaster, & Harriet A. Gaul by Calvary Parishioners, 1922)
St. George (Lantern Tower North, "Militant", in memory of Mary Maxwell McCreery by Mrs. J. Rogers McCreery, 1922)
St. Genevieve (Lantern Tower North, "Militant", in memory of Caroline R. Groff, Parish Visitor, by Calvary Parishioners, 1922)
St. Joan of Arc (Lantern Tower North, "Militant", in memory of Charles Frederick Wells, by Misses Wells, 1922)
St. Theodore (Lantern Tower North, "Militant", by Calvary Parishioners, 1922)
St. Michael (Lantern Tower East, "Archangel", in memory of Mrs. Frances C. Vandergrift by Mr. & Mrs. T.R. Hartley, 1922)
St. Gabriel (Lantern Tower East, "Archangel", in memory of Mrs. Frances C. Vandergrift by Mr. & Mrs. T.R. Hartley, 1922)
St. Raphael (Lantern Tower East, "Archangel", in memory of Mrs. Frances C. Vandergrift by Mr. & Mrs. T.R. Hartley, 1922)
St. Uriel (Lantern Tower East, "Archangel", in memory of Mrs. Frances C. Vandergrift by Mr. & Mrs. T.R. Hartley, 1922)
Nativity (Ladies Room, in memory of Elizabeth Kaye Sahm by Calvary Staff, 1929)
Pennsylvania Circuit Rider (Narthex South, in memory of Annie Clark Miller by Clark Miller, 1929)
Moravian Trumpeters (Narthex South, in memory of Annie Clark Miller by Clark Miller, 1929)
Benjamin Franklin and Kite (Narthex North, in memory of Judge J.J. Miller by Clark Miller, 1929)
Johnie Appleseed (Narthex North, in memory of Judge J.J. Miller by Clark Miller, 1929)
Washington-Aliquippa (Narthex West, in memory of H.P. Davis by Mrs. H.P. Davis, 1939)
Chief Cornplanter (Narthex West, in memory of H.P. Davis by Mrs. H.P. Davis, 1939)
Peter Minuit (Narthex West, in memory of H.P. Davis by Mrs. H.P. Davis, 1939)
Washington and Native American Chief (Narthex West, in memory of H.P. Davis by Mrs. H.P. Davis, 1939)
Capt. Contrecoeur (Parish House Walkway, in memory of Officers and Teachers of Church School by Church School Pupils, 1927)
William Penn and Native  Americans (Parish House Walkway, in memory of Officers and Teachers of Church School by Church School Pupils, 1927)
Washington & Braddock (Parish House Walkway, in memory of Officers and Teachers of Church School by Church School Pupils, 1927)
Daniel Boone & Braddock (Parish House Walkway, in memory of Officers and Teachers of Church School by Church School Pupils, 1927)
Perry at Lake Erie (Parish House Walkway, in memory of Officers and Teachers of Church School by Church School Pupils, 1927)
Lincoln at Gettysburg (Parish House Walkway, in memory of Officers and Teachers of Church School by Church School Pupils, 1927)
Francis Scott Key (Refectory, in memory of Sara H. Killikelly by Choir and Parishioners, 1930)
Stephen C. Foster (Refectory, in memory of Louise M. Richardson by Choir and Parishioners, 1930)
Liberty Bell (Refectory, in memory of Ed. H. Dermitt by Choir and Parishioners, 1930)
Regina Hartman (Refectory, in memory of William Allenby Choir and Parishioners, 1930)

Cox & Sons, London, England
Dorcas (Sacristy, in memory of Sarah Ann Walker by Mr. Edward Walker, 1907)

Harry E. Goodhue Company, Cambridge, Mass
Great Commission (North Aisle, in memory of Thomas C. Jenkins by Mrs. Thomas C. Jenkins, 1908)

Gorham Company, New York, NY
 Te Deum lauadamus (North Transept, in memory of John B. Jackson by Mary L. Jackson, 1911)

Heaton, Butler & Bayne, London, England
Nativity (South Aisle, in memory of J.T. & K.A. McKennan by Mrs. A. Grammer & H. Grammer, Mr. B. McKennan & Mrs. J.P. McKennan, 1907)
Adoration of the Magi (South Aisle, in memory of N.B. & C.C. Braden by Mrs. H. Carlin, Mrs. S. West, Miss A. Harper, Mr. J. Braden, 1907)
The Circumcision (South Aisle, in memory of G.H. and M.L. Thurston by Mrs. L. Stillwell, Mr. P. Barton, Misses A.L. & A.M. Thurston, (1907)
Good Shepherd and Christ Blessing the Children (South Aisle, in memory of C.J. and A.H. Adams by Mrs. S. Jarvis Adams, 1907)
Sermon on the Mount (South Aisle, in memory of J.H. Childs and M.H. Childs by Mrs. A. Wurts, Mrs. W. Rea, Mrs. H. Childs, 1907)
Woman of Samaria (North Aisle, in memory of Frances Matilda White and Georgianna White by Mrs. J.M. Ward, 1914)
Rich Young Ruler (North Aisle, in memory of William James Carlin by Mrs. W.T. Carlin, 1914)
Ministry of Women (North Aisle, in memory of Grace Parr Biddle McIlvaine by Rev. J.H. McIlvaine, Mrs. J. Heard, Mrs. E. Keeble, 1913)
Church Triumphant (West Window, by Women's Exchange of the Parish, 1910)
St. Matthew (South Nave Clerestory, in memory of Mary Gillespie by Mrs. J. Scaife, Mr. J. Magee, Rev. J. Magee, 1924)
St. Andrew (South Nave Clerestory, in memory of Eliza Kelso Carrier by Carrier Family, 1917)
St. Bartholomew (North Nave Clerestory, in memory of Harry Wilfred DuPuy and Amy DuPuy McHenry by Mr. & Mrs. Herbert DuPuy, 1923)
St. Peter (North Nave Clerestory, in memory of Men of the Parish who died in their country's service 1917-18 by Calvary Parishioners, 1923)
Isaiah (North Transept Clerestory East, in memory of William St. Clair Denny Corcoran by Mrs. W.D. Corcoran, 1914)
Jeremiah (North Transept Clerestory East, in memory of William St. Clair Denny Corcoran by Mrs. W.D. Corcoran, 1914)
St. Stephen (North Transept Clerestory West, in memory of Persifor Frazer Smith by Mrs. George S. Oliver, 1923)
St. Luke (North Transept Clerestory West, in memory of Astley Cooper Clark, M.D. by Mrs. Jessie Clark Morris, 1923)
Daniel (South Transept Clerestory East, in memory of John Cooper Bindley by Mr. John Bindley, 1917)
Ezekiel (South Transept Clerestory East, in memory of John Cooper Bindley by Mr. John Bindley, 1917)
Early English Saints (South Transept, in memory of Edwin Bindley by Mrs. Edwin Bindley, 1907)
St. Paul at Athens (All Saints' Chapel, in memory of Rev. J.H. McIlvaine, Rector VII, 1925)
St. Hugh and St. Victoria (All Saints' South Wall, in memory of Rt. Hon. Childers & Mrs. Childers by C.E.E. Childers, 1918)
Visitation/Annunciation (Baptistry, in memory of B.C. Jillson by Mrs. B.J. Jillson, 1910)

Reynolds, Francis & Rohnstock, Boston, Mass
St. James Major (South Nave Clerestory, in memory Delia Raymond Carr by Mr. W.H.R. Hilliard, 1924)
St. James Minor (South Nave Clerestory, in memory of George W. Guthrie by Mrs. George W. Guthrie, 1924)

Willet Stained Glass Company, Pittsburgh, Penna
East (Passion) Window (High Altar, in memory of T.M., M.A., A.B. Howe, & E.H. Nimick by Mrs. G. Guthrie, Mrs. J. Brown, Mrs. W. Corcoran, Mr. G. Howe, Mr. F. Nimick, 1907)
Annunciation (Lady Chapel, in memory of George & Margaret White by Miss Francis M. White, 1907)
Greatest in the Kingdom (North Aisle, in memory of Elizabeth R. McGill by Mrs. Martha R.K. McGill, 1908)

Woodwork in Calvary Church
One of the craftsmen who joined Cram in founding the Society of Arts and Crafts was John Kirchmayer (1860-1930). Kirchmayer's woodcarving is seen throughout Calvary's interior. The woodcarving was overseen by Irving and Casson, for whom Kirchmayer worked. Kirchmayer, born in Obergammergau, Bavaria, was the first woodcarver Cram met in America who knew how to create the medieval style carvings he needed for his churches. Cram's design for the woodwork at Calvary was inspired from 15th century examples in Devonshire and Essex, England.

Woodwork subjects 
Rood Screen, "Vine and Branches", designed by Ralph Adams Cram, encasing the chancel to represent the separation of Heaven and Earth
Rood Screen Cross, "Reigning Christ" with onlooking St. Mary and St. John, designed by Ralph Adams Cram (Originally, the cross was mounted without any statuary and in the reverse position, with the current east-facing design, Lamb of God and Four Gospels, facing west. As the story goes, Cram envisioned a large crucifix, but the vestry and wardens, being of low and Protestant ilk, would have none of it. How could they explain to their Presbyterian friends a symbol in their church of Romish idolatry? Under Rev. van Etten, Rector VIII, the cross was turned, the "Reigning Christ" - a compromise design between having a crucifix and none at all - was commissioned of Cram, and the carvings of Sts. Mary and John returned from St. Barnabas Free Home.)
Rood Screen Coats of Arms, "Sees of the Church of England, Ireland, and Wales": Glouster-Bristol, Lincoln, London, Winchester, Armagh of Ireland, York, Carlisle, Wells, Durham, and St. Davids.
The Rood Screen is in memory of William and Nancy Raymond by Mr. William Carr
Pulpit Figures; Lower: Jeremiah, Zachariah, Hosea, Ezekiel, and  Habakkuk. Upper: St. John Chrysostom, St. Francis of Assisi, St. Bernard of Clairvaux, Bishop Anselm Archbishop of Canterbury, and St. Athanasius, Savonarola.
Pulpit Coats of Arms, "Dioceses in Pennsylvania": Erie, Pennsylvania, Pittsburgh, Harrisburg. An adaptation of the United States Seal is on the left.
The Pulpit is in memory of Harry G. English by Mr. H.D.W. English
Lectern, "Rotating" with racks on each side for Old and New Testaments, depicts "I saw an angel having the everlasting Gospel" (Rev. 14:6).
In memory of Kate A. Clapp by Mr. and Mrs. D.C. Clapp
Reredos of the High Altar Figures, Left-to-Right: St. Michael (Guardian Angel), Sts. Columba, Augustine, Aiden (Missionaries), St. Peter, St. James (Bishop), St. Andrew (Missionary), St. John, Christ (Center), St. James, St. Philip (Missionary), St. Timothy (Bishop) St. Paul, Sts. Stephen, Ignatius, Alban (Martyrs), St. Gabriel (Guardian Angel).
In memory of Elizabeth Nimick Bonham and Elizabeth Nimick Bonham by Mr. and Mrs. D.G. Stewart
Choir Stall Figures: Angel with viol, Angel with lute, Angel with trumpet, Angel with portatif, King David writing Psalms, Zechariah with calipers, St. Simeon (author of the Nunc Dimittis), St. Mary (author of the Magnificat), St. Bernard of Cluny with cowl and tonsure, St. Bernard of Clairvaux with mitre and Prayer Book, St. Andrew with miter and whip, St. Theodulph (author of Gloria, Laus et Honor), Thomas Tallis (Father of English Church Music), John Marbecke (lay clerk and organist at St. George's Windsor), Henry Purcell (organist of Westminster Abbey and composer), and George Frederick Handel (composer).
In memory of Clara Morgan Shea, William Henry Singer, Arthur Murtland Scully by Mr. George M. Morgan
All Saints Chapel Reredos Figures, designed by Ralph Adams Cram, Left-to-Right: St. Mary, St. Anne, St. Michael, St. John, St. Francis of Assisi, and St. George and the Dragon.
In memory of Annie Burgwin Scully by Arthur M. Scully
All Saints Chapel Communion Rail, designed by Ralph Adams Cram, "Vine and Fruit"
In memory of Charlotte Hoag by Margaret Hoag
Lady Chapel communion rail and credence table are from the second church on Penn Ave.
In memory of John M. Murtland by Mrs. John M. Murtland and Miss Hester J. Murtland
Baptismal Font Cover Six Carvings, designed by Ralph Adams Cram: Visit of Mary to St. Elizabeth; The naming of St. John; Jesus and St. John the Baptist; The preaching of St. John the Baptist; The baptism of Jesus; and The beheading of St. John the Baptist. Inscription: But as many as received Him, to them gave He power to become the sons of God. (John 1:12)
In memory of Sarah Miller Tomer Schirra by Mrs. W.K.T. Sahm

Chancel Tile and Marble in Calvary Church
The tile and marble floor pattern of the chancel represents heaven by use of a cross within a square and is similar to a floor design at St. Chad's Church Burton-on-Trent, England. The cross materials are Knoxville white marble, the borders are of green tiles, the background is of reddish-brown tiles made by Addison Brayton Le Boutillier for the Grueby Faience Company of Boston. The corner tiles depict the symbols of the four evangelists, and the background and border tiles represent the garden of paradise.

Stonework subjects and locations 
St. Andrew, exterior north entrance to Narthex
Sts. Matthew, Mark, Luke & John, exterior west facade
Sts. Timothy, Stephen & Barnabas, exterior south entrance to Narthex
Sts. Peter & Paul, interior Narthex
Moses, Isaiah, & David, within the Nave on the Narthex wall
Symbols of the Christian and Jewish religions: Chi Rho; Trinity; Dove of the Holy Spirit; Star; Crown; Alpha; Yahweh (Hebrew word for God); Omega; Seven-branched candlesticks (symbol for Old Testament worship, known as the Menorah); all within the Nave on the Narthex wall
Rectors of Calvary Church (names incised in stone), within the Nave on the Narthex wall
St. John the Baptist, All Saints' Chapel (In memory of Rt. Hon. Hugh Childers and Mrs. Childers by Mr. C.E.E. Childers)
Sts. Michael & Gabriel, All Saints' Chapel (In memory of Rt. Hon. Hugh Childers and Mrs. Childers by Mr. C.E.E. Childers)
Sts. Matthew, Mark, Luke & John, Chancel High Altar (In memory of John Edward Botsford by Mr. E.P. Botsford)
Vine, Lady Chapel Altar (In memory of Ellen Rumsey McLean by Mr. H.D.W. English)
Sts. Matthew (depicted as a winged man), Mark (depicted as a winged lion), Luke (depicted as a winged ox) & (depicted as an eagle) John, Baptismal Font Base (Given by Mr. John Bissell)
St. James, north wall entrance from Lady Chapel to Parish House
World War I Memorial (493 names who served & 26 who gave their lives), Baptistry wall, 1949

1991-1993 Restorations
The 1991-1993 restoration included plaster repairs, cleaning of stone, and addition of handicapped access ramps. The pendant lights were moved to the center of the bays to provide more uniform light, and a new wood floor was installed to replace the former wood floor under the pews to improve the acoustic performance of the space. A crossing platform was added to extend the level of the chancel towards the nave and to provide a place for a temporary altar closer to the congregation for medium-sized services (the transept pews were turned to face the new platform at this time); the new platform also provided safer passage to the lectern. New floor tile for the platform was carefully made by hand in North Carolina so as to match the original and allow for repairs to the original floor where needed. The crossing chandelier, having been taken down and deconstructed (the large ring had been used in the Narthex), was restored and reconstructed from pieces found in the basement. The All Saints' Chapel altar rail, installed in 1924, was removed and relocated to the baptistery (the chapel had been renamed "All Saints' Chapel" from "St. Andrew's Chapel" around 1940). The new parclose screen in the All Saints' Chapel was made by Herbert Read Ltd. of Tiverton, Devon, England. In the Lady Chapel, two reconstructions of the original electric lamps designed by Cram's partner Bertram Goodhue were hung in the space. A wood screen was added to define the space of the All Saints' Chapel, and an original lighting fixture was installed.

All of these minor interior modifications have left Cram's original design essentially intact. They have enhanced the use of the space for its use as a house of worship today.

Other renovations
The parish house wing has had several renovations. The major spaces and their original architectural appointments, however, have survived intact, although some of these spaces were renamed and reassigned to different uses. The 1975 addition created the large multi-purpose parish hall, which although carefully integrated to existing hallways, has a more contemporary feeling. The 2004 interior renovation undid 1951 alterations, simplified circulation, added elevators and other accessibility improvements. Work was carefully designed and executed to match original details and finishes.

Parish House as a military hospital
The Parish House wing was used as a U.S. military hospital during the influenza epidemic of 1918. In 1918, Cram designed the Celtic Cross World War I Memorial; it was made by the New England Granite Company of Westerly, Rhode Island. In the yard north of the church is a gabled stone site sign which was designed by Cram and installed in 1918.

First radio broadcast of a church service
Calvary has held an important place in history of radio broadcasting. On January 2, 1921, the first ever radio broadcast of a church service was conducted from Calvary Episcopal Church by the International Radio Company on KDKA Westinghouse with the Westinghouse Electric Corporation. A bronze tablet commemorating the event was installed in 1923. The live radio broadcasts continued for nineteen years.

Second World War Memorial
In 1949, a Second World War Memorial was dedicated in the church with the names of 493 men and women veterans of the parish carved into the north wall. The memorial was designed by Pittsburgh architects Schwab, Ingham, and Davis. The baptismal font Cram designed was moved from south of the chancel to north of the chancel at the War Memorial wall.

Alcoholics Anonymous

In 1951, the Rev. Sam Shoemaker, who already had a nationwide radio show, accepted a call as the church's 12th rector. Shoemaker, who helped to found Alcoholics Anonymous and had long served as rector of Calvary Church in New York City, soon launched what he called the "Pittsburgh Experiment", seeking to bring Christian values into the workplace and everyday life. Although Shoemaker died in 1963 and the church recently installed its 16th rector, Shoemaker's legacy lives on in the Next Step Group which meets Tuesdays and Saturdays at the church.

Columbarium
In 1973-74, a columbarium was installed in the ambulatory between the Lady Chapel and the chancel. It contains 250 niches for 850 urns. It was designed by Pittsburgh architect Lawrence Wolfe, bronze work made by the J.H. Matthews Company of Pittsburgh, wood work made by John Winterich and Company, Cleveland, Ohio.

Instruments
The current building's first organ, a gift of Mr. John B. Jackson and Miss Jackson, was built by the M.P. Moller Company of Hagerstown, Maryland and used between 1907 and 1963. The instrument had four divisions and electric-pneumatic action. The instrument was described in 1908 as "fully adequate to the great size of the building, filling it to the utmost when desired, and yet the softest tones are heard in the most remote parts of the church." This organ console sat on a platform near the High Altar.

The second and current organ in Calvary Church is by Casavant Frères Limitée, Opus 2729, 1963. The case of the Casavant organ was carved by Andrew Druscelli of Irving and Casson A.H. Davenport Company of Cambridge, Massachusetts. As part of the 1991-1993 restorations, a new organ console was constructed to accommodate the enlargement and enhancement of the instrument. It was moved from being closer to the altar to its present location behind the lectern, facing the center of the chancel to allow the organist to face the choir.

Over the past several years, Calvary Episcopal Church has contracted with Luley & Associates to make revisions and repairs to its 1963/1991 Casavant Freres organ (IV/138). These revisions include: the replacement of the Recit chorus reeds; the addition of several new ranks of flue pipes; recomposition and revoicing of several Mixtures; the addition of the 8' Tuba Mirabilis on the Grand Orgue; the replacement of the Antiphonal 8' Trompette en Chamade; revoicing of select existing flue pipework; replacement of the Solid State control system; replacement and expansion of the console coupler rail and controls; new face plates for pistons and stop knobs. A new Pedal 32' Ophicleide unit speaks at 32', 16', and 8' pitches.

Other instrumental resources include a continuo organ (Taylor & Boody Op. 59, 2007), Bechstein grand piano, ca. 1890, an Italian-style harpsichord (Dupree, 1984), a pair of Ludwig timpani, a set of Dutch-style handbells, and eleven cast-bronze Meneely bells housed in the tower.

Patron saint

According to Calvary Archives, the Rev. Edwin van Etten, eighth Rector of Calvary Church, chose St. Michael as the patron saint of Calvary in 1923. The twelfth Rector, the Rev. Samuel Shoemaker, reaffirmed this choice in the 1950s. Ever since, St. Michael has been Calvary's patron. Ralph Adams Cram included numerous images of Michael throughout the building. There are at least twelve images of Michael including stained glass windows, statues behind the High Altar and All Saints’ Chapel Altar and War Memorial Cross, to the shield on the Rector’s Chair.

Sheldon Calvary Camp
In 1936, Calvary Congregation recognized a need to engage its youth during summer months. Through a gift of Mrs. Harry E. Sheldon, Calvary purchased the YMCA Camp Porter (renamed The Harry E. Sheldon-Calvary Camp) on the shores of Lake Erie near Conneaut, Ohio. An endowment for maintenance was started by an additional twenty-five Calvary Parishioners. The property comprised fifty-two acres, with a lake frontage of a thousand feet with buildings and equipment. Later several permanent cabins, showers, administration buildings, a craft house and a dispensary were built and the property improved with athletic fields. The cost of these additions were met by gifts of members of the congregation. Calvary Camp continues to the present day as a ministry of the Diocese of Pittsburgh with sponsorship from Calvary Church.

2003 Lawsuit
In 2003, Calvary Episcopal Church sued the Pittsburgh Diocese and Bishops Robert Duncan and Henry Scriven over actions taken by a special convention the Diocese held after the 2003 General Convention. At the special convention, the Diocese had passed a resolution that asserted that all property of individual parishes belonged to the parishes themselves, rather than to the diocese. In the suit, Calvary claimed that the Diocese could not take such an action, as it violated the Dennis Canon. Eventually, the suit was settled out of court. The final settlement did not affirm Calvary Church's central contention that diocesan property was held in trust for the national church, but it created a process by which the diocese agreed to make decisions about property and assets should a congregation wish to leave the diocese.

Archbishop Desmond Tutu
Archbishop Desmond Tutu visited Pittsburgh and delivered a sermon to an audience of 1,100 on Thursday, October 25, 2007 in Calvary Church. A tablet was erected to commemorate the event. During this visit, Archbishop Tutu was given honorary degrees from Carnegie Mellon University and the University of Pittsburgh.

Rectors
 The Rev. William H. Paddock, January 1855-April 1858
 The Rev. Robert B. Peet, January 1859-January 1867
 The Rev. Joseph D. Wilson, May 1867-February 1874
 The Rev. Boyd Vincent, D.D., April 1874-January 1889
 The Rev. George Hodges, D.D. D.C.L., January 1889-January 1894
 The Rev. William D. Maxon, D.D., May 1894-December 1898
 The Rev. James H. McIlvaine, D.D., June 1900-October 1916
 The Rev. Edwin J. van Etten, D.D., November 1917-August 1940
 The Rev. Arthur B. Kinsolving, II, D.D., November 1940-May 1945
 The Rev. Lauriston L. Scaife, D.D., S.T.D., July 1945-May 1948
 The Rev. William W. Lumpkin, A.B., B.D., June 1948-September 1951
 The Rev. Samuel M. Shoemaker, D.D., S.T.D., March 1952-December 1961
 The Rev. John-Karl M. Baiz, June 1962-May 1984
 The Rev. Arthur F. McNulty, Jr., July 1985-September 1994
 The Rev. Harold T. Lewis, Ph.D., September 1996-November 2012
 The Rev. Jonathon W. Jenson, February 2014-Present

Organists
 Belle White, Organist, c.1855-1868
 Sarah Killikelly, Organist, 1868-1889
 Carl Retter, Organist-Choirmaster, 1889-1898
 Hermon B. Keese, Organist-Choirmaster, 1898-1899
 Gilden R. Broadberry, Organist-Choirmaster, 1899-1907
 James E. Bagley, Organist-Choirmaster, 1907-1910
 Dr. Harvey Gaul, Organist-Choirmaster, 1910-1945
 Dr. J. Julius Baird, Organist-Choirmaster, 1946-1954
 Donald Wilkins, Organist-Choirmaster, 1954-1997
 Dr. Alan Lewis, Director of Music, 1997-present

Notable people
James W. Brown, United States Congressman
William J. Diehl, 38th Mayor of Pittsburgh
Henry Clay Frick, American Industrialist
George W. Guthrie, 42nd Mayor of Pittsburgh, United States Ambassador to Japan
Elsie Hilliard Hillman, Philanthropist & Political Activist
Henry Hillman, American Businessman & Industrialist
William N. McNair, 49th Mayor of Pittsburgh
Jacob J. Miller, Judge
David A. Reed, United States Senator
Cornelius D. Scully, 50th Mayor of Pittsburgh
William Wilkins American Judge and Politician

References

Further reading

External links
 Calvary Episcopal Church
Calvary Episcopal Church Art and Architecture
Calvary Episcopal Church Virtual Tour
Calvary Episcopal Church Self-guided Tour
Church records at the University of Pittsburgh Library System

Episcopal churches in Pennsylvania
Churches in Pittsburgh
Ralph Adams Cram church buildings
Churches completed in 1907